Sascha Burchert (born 30 October 1989) is a German professional footballer who plays as a goalkeeper for  club FC St. Pauli.

Club career
Burchert began his career with Wartenberger SV. In summer 2002, he was scouted by Hertha BSC. He signed his first professional contract on 30 January 2008. Burchert made his Hertha debut on 17 September 2009 in a Europa League match against Latvian side, FK Ventspils and came on in the twenty-first minute replacing starting goalkeeper Jaroslav Drobný.

Burchert played his first Bundesliga game on 20 September 2009 against Hamburger SV. In his second game Burchert conceded two strange goals. Having replaced the injured Timo Ochs with the score at 1–1, Burchert was caught off his line having headed a clearance from a through ball, with Hamburg's David Jarolím volleying the ball into an empty net from long range. Two minutes later the same thing happened, with Zé Roberto scoring from the edge of the centre circle with Burchert off his line following another headed clearance.

In the 2013–14 season Burchert was pushed further down the pecking order for Hertha as the side has preferred Thomas Kraft and Marius Gersbeck over him.

On 25 April 2015, Burchert started his first match in the Bundesliga in five years in a 1–0 loss against Bayern Munich. He conceded an 80th-minute goal to Bastian Schweinsteiger. Hertha BSC had been on a seven match undefeated streak.

On 20 June 2016, Burchert signed with Greuther Fürth.

On 8 August 2022, Burchert moved to FC St. Pauli.

Personal life
Sascha is the brother of fellow goalkeeper Nico Burchert, playing for Paderborn.

Career statistics

References

External links
 
 

1989 births
Living people
Footballers from Berlin
German footballers
Association football goalkeepers
Germany under-21 international footballers
Bundesliga players
2. Bundesliga players
Regionalliga players
Eliteserien players
Hertha BSC players
Hertha BSC II players
Vålerenga Fotball players
SpVgg Greuther Fürth players
FC St. Pauli players
German expatriate footballers
German expatriate sportspeople in Norway
Expatriate footballers in Norway